Cinderella pollinosa is a species of fly in the family Heleomyzidae.

References

Heleomyzidae
Insects described in 1969